Mira Monte High School is a high school located at 1800 South Fairfax Road in southeast Bakersfield, California.  It opened for the school year of 2008–2009.  It is in the Kern High School District.

Notes

Public high schools in California
High schools in Bakersfield, California
2008 establishments in California
Educational institutions established in 2008